The long-clawed shrew (Sorex unguiculatus) is a species of shrew. It is distributed through the uplands of northeastern Asia, including northeastern North Korea.

References

Sorex
Mammals of Korea
Mammals described in 1890